Chris Klug (born November 18, 1972) is a professional  alpine snowboarder.  After receiving a liver transplant in 2000 to treat primary sclerosing cholangitis, he went on to compete in the 2002 Winter Olympics in Salt Lake City, winning a bronze medal in the Parallel Giant Slalom.  This was the first and so far only time a transplantee had competed in the Olympics, either winter or summer.  He also won a bronze medal, and lit the torch at the 2002 National Kidney Foundation U.S. Transplant Games. He is an alumnus of Deerfield Academy.

In 2004, Klug released a book called To the Edge and Back: My Story from Organ Transplant Survivor to Olympic Snowboarder.  He is an active supporter of organ donation and recently founded the Chris Klug Foundation and Donor Dudes to spread awareness of the need for organ donors.

Personal life
Klug is married to Melissa April. They live in Aspen, Colorado and Sisters, Oregon with their two children.

Chris Klug Foundation 
In 2003, The Chris Klug Foundation was founded and started by Chris Klug himself, following year after he competed in the Winter Olympics.  The start of the foundation was a result on Klug's ambition to help save lives and advertise a healthy, active life after receiving a transplant.  The Chris Klug Foundation is devoted, "to promoting lifesaving organ and tissue donation and improving the quality of life for those touched by donation." Through the foundation's programs, they have inspired and influenced over thousands of young adults by sharing facts and information about organ and tissue donation so they can make educated decisions. 

Based in Aspen, Colorado, they are able to spread donor awareness at several events throughout the year such as during the Winter X Games and during their own popular event called Summit For Life, a nighttime uphill race up Aspen Mountain.

References

External links 
 
 
 
 Donor Dudes

1972 births
American male snowboarders
Living people
Snowboarders at the 1998 Winter Olympics
Snowboarders at the 2002 Winter Olympics
Snowboarders at the 2010 Winter Olympics
Liver transplant recipients
Deerfield Academy alumni
Medalists at the 2002 Winter Olympics
Olympic bronze medalists for the United States in snowboarding
X Games athletes
Sportspeople from Aspen, Colorado
People from Sisters, Oregon